The styca (. stycas) was a small coin minted in pre-Viking Northumbria, originally in base silver and subsequently in a copper alloy. Production began in the 790s and continued until the 850s, though the coin remained in circulation until the Viking conquest of Northumbria in 867.

Etymology 
The coin's name derives from Old English styċċe , meaning "piece."

History

Stycas were first minted in the reign of Æthelred I of Northumbria (790–796), replacing the earlier sceat which ceased production in c. 790. They were initially made from a debased alloy of silver, and from c. 830 until c. 835 they were also minted in a copper alloy. Production switched over entirely to copper in c. 837 and lasted until c. 855. Production ceased at this time, though the coin remained in circulation until the Viking conquest of Northumbria in 867. Stycas were unique to Northumbria; from the late eighth century onwards the other Anglo-Saxon kingdoms minted only silver pennies based on the Frankish denier. The vast number of copper stycas which are known to exist indicates that production from the 830s onwards was both intensive and constant. The large quantity of stycas produced, combined with the fact that large numbers of stycas are clearly of unofficial creation, might suggest a reason as to why production was halted in the reign of Osberht of Northumbria.

Design
With a few exceptions, the various issues of stycas share a common design standard. Typically the name of the issuing king (or archbishop) appears on one side surrounding a central motif, and the name of the moneyer who made the coin appears on the other side. Common central motifs include simple cruciform designs and rings of annulets. Exceptions include those stycas made by the moneyer Leofdegn during the reign of Æthelred II of Northumbria. These stycas feature much more elaborate designs including complex central cruciform devices and one issue in particular features both a hound and a triquetra on the same side.

Hoards 
Hoards that consist of stycas, or where stycas are part of the assemblage, include:

 Hexham Hoard
 Kirkoswald Hoard
St Leonard's Place hoard
 Talnotrie Hoard

See also 

 Elizabeth Pirie
Wigmund (archbishop of York)

References

Bibliography
 
 

Anglo-Saxon money
Numismatics
Silver coins
Copper coins